Mughan is a village and the least populous municipality in the Bilasuvar District of Azerbaijan. It has a population of 310.

References 

Populated places in Bilasuvar District